Blestium (also Blestio in the Antonine Itinerary (Iter XIII)) was a small fort and iron working centre in the Roman province of Britannia Superior, part of Roman Britain. It has been identified with the site of the later town of Monmouth in south east Wales, located adjoining the confluence of the River Monnow with the River Wye. A plaque on the local bank records its position.

History and remains
The reference to Blestio in the Antonine Itinerary is the only one made to the settlement in Roman sources. It is suggested that the name may derive from the Greek word βλαστος, meaning "offshoot".

It is now generally accepted that a Neronian or pre-Flavian military fort was established at Monmouth, perhaps before 55 AD, making it the earliest Roman fort in Wales.  The fort was probably established, either by Publius Ostorius Scapula or his successor Aulus Didius Gallus, during the first advances of the Romans against the Silures of south east Wales. The invading forces established a series of auxiliary forts along the Monnow valley into mid Wales, as well as advancing towards Usk where they established the fort of Burrium. The Silures fought a successful guerrilla war against the Romans for some thirty years before being defeated by the forces led by Sextus Julius Frontinus. The fort at Blestium is believed to have housed around 2,000 soldiers during the initial campaign, and later to have remained as a small fortlet.

Relatively few Roman remains had been found at Monmouth until recently. The first ditch of the fort was discovered in 2007 by the Monmouth Archaeological Society behind properties on Monnow Street, within Monmouth town centre. Excavations in 2010 in Agincourt Square also uncovered pottery and bones, which appear to confirm the existence of a fort.  There is substantial evidence of iron working dating from the Roman period, drawing on local iron ore and charcoal for smelting from local forests.  This includes hearths and waste slag, both in the town centre and in the Overmonnow area.  Stone buildings  associated with 2nd and 3rd century iron working have been excavated near the crossing of the River Monnow. Coins found in the town date mainly from the third and fourth centuries, suggesting continuing civilian settlement.

Monmouth Heritage Trail

The Monmouth Heritage Trail includes a blue plaque recording the Roman fort of Blestium. This is attached to a late eighteenth-century town house which is now used as the Lloyds TSB bank in Monnow Street. The house was occupied, and probably built, by Philip Meakins Hardwick, who was one of the founders of the Monmouth Picnic Club of local gentlemen responsible for developing the viewpoint and buildings on The Kymin around 1800. The house became the home of Monmouth's town clerk and Viscount Nelson and his entourage were entertained there during their visit to the town on 19 August 1802. Another notable resident was said to be the architect Philip Fisher who lived at the house whilst designing improvements to the Shire Hall in the 1720s. The building is a Grade II listed building.

See also
Wales in the Roman Era

References

Bibliography

History of Monmouth, Wales
Roman fortifications in Monmouthshire
Archaeological sites in Monmouthshire
Roman towns in Wales
Buildings and structures in Monmouth, Wales
Roman legionary fortresses in Wales